Le Thi Thu Thuy, known as Madame Thuy, is the chief executive of the automotive company VinFast and vice-chairwoman of the Vingroup conglomerate which is its parent company.

She was born in 1974 in the Binh Dinh province of Vietnam and educated in business and economics at Hanoi Foreign Trade University, [[International University of Japan, IUJ]] and Harvard Kennedy School.  Her qualifications include Chartered Financial Analyst (CFA) and Master of Business Administration (MBA).

She was a vice-president at Lehman Brothers from 2000 to 2008 and then joined Vingroup where she started by working on the company's international investments and partnerships.

In 2017, she was made responsible for opening the first automobile factory in Vietnam – a new venture for Vingroup which planned to establish VinFast as a new automobile brand.  Initially, VinFast sold traditional ICE cars, such as its version of the BMW X5, in its domestic market.  Madame Thuy is now the chief executive of VinFast and, under her leadership, the company plans to go fully electric and market its products globally.

References

1974 births
20th-century businesspeople
21st-century businesspeople
Automotive businesspeople
Lehman Brothers people
Living people
People from Bình Định province
Harvard Kennedy School alumni